The Automatic Gun-Laying Turret (AGLT), also known as the Frazer-Nash FN121, was a radar-directed, rear gun turret fitted to some British bombers from 1944. AGLT incorporated both a low-power tail warning radar and fire-control system, which could detect approaching enemy fighters, aim and automatically trigger machine guns – in total darkness or cloud cover if necessary. The radar warning and fire-control system itself was commonly known by the code names Village Inn and "Z Equipment", as well as the serial number TR3548.

It was intended that all Royal Air Force bombers, and other Allied aircraft attached to Bomber Command would have an IFF infra-red nose lamp, which would allow rear gunners to avoid friendly fire. In practice, however, Allied aircraft without lamps often crossed paths with AGLT aircraft and, even when they were fitted and operational, the lamps were not always visible to gunners, for various reasons. As a result, Village Inn was generally used purely as an early warning system. According to the official history of the RCAF during World War II, fully automated "blind-firing" was used by gunners in only four out of every 1,000 sorties.

Development
The system was devised by a team led by Philip Dee and designed under the aegis of chief designer Alan Hodgkin, after receiving a request from the Air Ministry for such a system in early 1943. Village Inn was evaluated and tested by the Telecommunications Research Establishment (TRE) at RAF Defford using the Lancaster Mark I serial number ND712 Lancaster Mark III JB705 and Mk II LL736 and LL737 and subsequently put into production.

The system consisted of a transmitter/receiver unit mounted in the navigator's compartment, operating through a conical scanning parabolic aerial attached to rear turrets. It worked on a wavelength of 9.1 cm (3 GHz) with a pulse repetition frequency of 660 Hertz. The magnetron used was the CV186 of approx 35kW. The electronics sent a signal back to the turret, where it was displayed on a cathode ray tube (CRT) display screen positioned adjacent to the gun sight, the image of which was projected on to the Mark IIC gyro gunsight via a semi-transparent mirror.

Initially, ranging information was provided only at the transmitter situated in the navigator's compartment and was read off to the gunner over the intercom, the gunner using foot pedals to set the target range on the sight. In production equipment the process was made automatic, the range information being fed electronically directly into the gunsight, with the navigator's "running commentary" only being retained for the benefit of the rest of the crew. The gunner simply maneuvered his guns to place the "blip" in the centre of the gunsight's reticle and opened fire when the range was appropriate. Windage, bullet drop, and other factors were already calculated by the gunsight.

The first squadron to use Village Inn operationally was No. 101 Squadron RAF, based at Ludford Magna, in the autumn of 1944, followed soon afterwards by No. 49 in the attack on Darmstadt on September 11/12, 156 and 635 Squadrons.

Village Inn was eventually produced in four Marks:
 AGLT Mark I — initial design — Airborne Radio Installation (ARI) 5559.
 AGLT Mark II — modified, improved, Mark I — soon discontinued — ARI 5561.
 AGLT Mark III — scanning aerial mounted remotely from turret. Scan independent of turret's movements — ARI 5562.
 AGLT Mark IV — ARI 5632

The system was also fitted to the Rose turret on at least one Avro Lincoln B.Mk II, although how many is not known. Some Lincolns fitted with the Boulton Paul Type D tail turret also incorporated the equipment.

A similar type of system was produced in the US by the Emerson Electric Company of St. Louis, Missouri when an Emerson Model III tail turret was equipped with the Emerson APG8 Blind Tracking Radar and fitted to the Canadian-built Lancaster KB805. The system was found to have no advantages over the British system and the project was subsequently dropped.

See also
 Telecommunications Research Establishment
 RAF Defford
 List of World War II electronic warfare equipment

References

External links

 A photograph of a Village Inn-equipped 635 Sqn Lancaster
 Illustration of a 460 Sqn Lancaster I/III fitted with Village Inn
 [http://1000aircraftphotos.com/Contributions/7800L-4.jpg A photograph of a Village Inn-equipped Rose Rice turret on an Avro Lincoln
 [http://www.wolverhamptonhistory.org.uk/people/at_war/ww2/production/turret A photograph of a Village Inn-equipped twin .5 in turret on a Handley Page Halifax
 Village Inn (PDF)
 Eyewitness account of Village Inn testing on 460 Squadron

Aircraft radars
World War II British electronics
World War II radars
Military radars of the United Kingdom